Masanori Katsumoto (born 18 September 1933) is a Japanese equestrian. He competed in two events at the 1964 Summer Olympics.

References

External links
 

1933 births
Living people
Japanese male equestrians
Olympic equestrians of Japan
Equestrians at the 1964 Summer Olympics
Place of birth missing (living people)